Dibiasi may refer to:

 Carlo Dibiasi (1909–1984), Italian diver who competed in the 1936 Summer Olympics
 Klaus Dibiasi (born 1947), former diver from Italy, who competed in four consecutive Summer Olympics
 Maria Dibiasi, Italian luger who competed in the early 1970s

See also 
 DiBiase (disambiguation)
 Di Biase, a surname